Judith of Lens (born Normandy, between 1054 and 1055 - died Fotheringhay, c. 1090) was a niece of William the Conqueror. She was a daughter of his sister, Adelaide of Normandy (Countess of Aumale) and Lambert II, Count of Lens.

Life 

In 1070, Judith married Earl Waltheof of Huntingdon and Northumbria. They had three children – Maud de Lens aka Matilda (1074-1130), Judith (1075-1137) and Adelese aka Alice (c. 1075/76-1126). Their eldest daughter, Maud, brought the earldom of Huntingdon to her second husband, David I of Scotland. Their daughter, Adelise, married Raoul III de Conches whose sister, Godehilde, married Baldwin I of Jerusalem.

In 1075, Waltheof joined the Revolt of the Earls against William. It was the last serious act of resistance against the Norman Conquest of England. Some sources claim that Judith betrayed Waltheof to the bishop of Winchester, who informed her uncle, the king. Other sources say that Waltheof was innocent and that it was he who notified the bishop and king of the plot. Waltheof was beheaded on 31 May 1076 at St Giles Hill, near Winchester.

After Waltheof's execution, Judith was betrothed by William to Simon I of St. Liz, 1st Earl of Northampton by her uncle, William. Judith refused to marry Simon and fled the country to avoid William's anger. He then (temporarily) confiscated all Judith's English estates. Simon married Judith's daughter, Maud, in or before 1090.

Properties 
Judith held properties in 10 counties in the Midlands and East Anglia. Before the Norman invasion, these would have been lands held by her Saxon husband, Waltheof. After the transfer of property to the Norman's, Waltheof was left with only one manor in his name.

Judith's holdings included land and properties in:
Elstow, Bedfordshire
Kempston, Bedfordshire
Potton, Bedfordshire
Hitchin, Herfordshire
Sawtry, Huntingdonshire - the parish of Sawtry Judith is named after the countess.
Ashby Folville, Leicestershire
Lowesby, Leicestershire
Earls Barton, Northamptonshire
Great Doddington, Northamptonshire
Grendon, Northamptonshire
Merton, Oxfordshire
Piddington, Oxfordshire

Judith held eight manors in her own name - i.e. manors which Doomsday shows were not let, by her, to local lords. Those eight manors, scattered around the ten counties, may have been used by Judith as homes when visiting her various estates. Included in them were the manors of Elstow and Kempston in Bedfordshire.

Judith founded Elstow Abbey in around 1078, as a Benedictine nunnery, possibly as a memorial to Waltheof. She endowed the Abbey with a considerable amount of her properties in several counties. 
Judith also founded All Saints church in Kempston. 
Given these strong local connections, it is possible that Judith's primary home may have been at the manor at Kempston.
Judith also founded a church at Hitchin and Elstow Abbey held a large amount of her property in that area.

From the Domesday Book
In POTONE Hugh holds ½ virgate of land from the Countess. Land for 1 plough; it is there, with 1 smallholder. The value is and was 5s; before 1066, 2s. Earl Tosti held this land in Potton, his manor.

Countess Judith holds POTONE herself. It answers for 10 hides. Land for 12 ploughs. In lordship 3½ hides; 3 ploughs there. 18 villagers and 2 Freemen with 8 ploughs; a ninth possible. 13 smallholders and 3 slaves. 1 mill, 5s; meadow for 12 ploughs; pasture for the village livestock. In total, value £12; when acquired 100s; before 1066 £13.
King Edward held this manor; it was Earl Tosti's. There were 4 Freemen who had 1 hide and 1 virgate; they could grant to whom they would.

In (Cockayne) HATLEY Countess Judith holds 3 hides and 2½ virgates as one manor. Land for 6½ ploughs. In lordship 1 hide and ½ virgate; 2 ploughs there. 8 villagers with 4½ ploughs; woodland, 4 pigs. Value £6 5s; when acquired 100s; before 1066 £6.
Earl Tosti held this manor. It lies in Potton, the Countess' own manor. A Freeman had 1 virgate; he could grant and sell, and withdraw to another lord.

Ranulf brother of Ilger holds EVERTON from the Countess. It answers for 5 hides. Land for 5 ploughs; 2 ploughs there; 3 possible. 4 villagers; 5 smallholders. Meadow for 1 plough. Value £3; when acquired 100s; as much before 1066.
Earl Tosti held this manor. It lay in Potton, the Countess' own manor.

Sources
Ancestral Roots of Certain American Colonists Who Came to America Before 1700 by Frederick Lewis Weis, Lines 98A-23, 130-25.
Chronicles of Elstow Abbey by Rev'd SR Wigram, Elstow 1885

1050s births
11th-century deaths
House of Boulogne
1080s deaths
11th-century English landowners
Women landowners
11th-century English women